Fox Lake is a national historic district located in Pleasant Township, Steuben County, Indiana.  The district encompasses 27 contributing buildings associated with the Fox Lake Resort vacation community. It developed between 1928 and 1950 as a vacation resort for middle class African-Americans. The cottages are primarily one-story, frame dwellings with gable roofs and concrete block foundations.

It was listed on the National Register of Historic Places in 2001.

References

African-American history of Indiana
Historic districts on the National Register of Historic Places in Indiana
Buildings and structures in Steuben County, Indiana
National Register of Historic Places in Steuben County, Indiana